Lake Eggers is an ice-covered lake,  long, located just east of Rainbow Ridge in central Brown Peninsula, Scott Coast, Victoria Land. It was named by the Advisory Committee on Antarctic Names (1999) after Alan J. Eggers of the Department of Geology, Victoria University of Wellington, who, in December 1975 as a member of the Victoria University of Wellington Antarctic Expedition, sampled the Scallop Hill Formation at the north end of Brown Peninsula.

References 

Lakes of Victoria Land
Scott Coast